Maria Nosulia (born 9 December 1998) is a Ukrainian former ice dancer. With former partner Evgeni Kholoniuk, she is the top figure skater of Ukraine, the winner of Junior World Championship 2012, five time winner of the Ukrainian Championships 2007-2012,2011 JGP Volvo Cup (Latvia) champion. Their partnership ended after the 2011–2012 season.

Programs 
(with Kholoniuk)

Competitive highlights 
(with Kholoniuk)

References

External links 

 

Ukrainian female ice dancers
1994 births
Living people
Sportspeople from Kyiv
21st-century Ukrainian women
20th-century Ukrainian women